Roy Martin was an American politician who served as mayor of Norfolk, Virginia from 1962 to 1974. A Democrat, he was renown for his support of Racial integration and served as the 31st President of the United States Conference of Mayors from 1973 to 1974.

Early life
Martin attended high school at Maury High School and graduated in 1939. Martin attended the Norfolk division of the College of William & Mary from 1939 to 1940 before it transitioned into Old Dominion University. He then attended the University of Virginia where he received a Bachelor's degree in commerce. After college Martin served in the Navy during World War II. Upon the conclusion of the war he returned to Norfolk to run a food brokerage business.

Political career

City Council
Martin was appointed to the city council by mayor W. Fred Duckworth in 1953 becoming the city's youngest councilor. During his first year in office there was talk among the city council to transition the Norfolk division of William and Mary into a four-year institution. However, despite support from mayor Duckworth, the city council rejected he prospect due to fear that they would be left covering the cost of the institution without state funding. Nine years later in 1962 this proposed transition was revisited and passed with the division becoming the Old Dominion University. 

In 1959, during the Massive resistance movement all white schools in the city where shut down to prevent racial integration. The city council then held a vote to additionally shut down all black schools, Martin was the sole dissenting vote on the city council voting to keep the schools open.

Mayor of Norfolk
Martin succeeded Duckworth as mayor in 1962. During his tenure he helped create the Chrysler Museum of Art and the MacArthur Memorial as well as green lighting the creation of a new arena and recreation development. Martin served as the 31st President of the United States Conference of Mayors from 1973 to 1974.

Retirement
Martin retired from the mayoralty and the city council in 1974 upon the completion of his term as President of the United States Conference of Mayors. However, he remained active and participated in several local boards and was the city's goodwill ambassador. He was also commander of the American Legion Post No. 300.

Personal life
Martin was married to Louise Eggleston Martin and the couple had a son and a daughter. Martin died in 2002 at the age of 81 after a battle with cancer.

References

1921 births
2002 deaths
College of William & Mary alumni
Mayors of Norfolk, Virginia
University of Virginia alumni
Virginia Democrats